The Old Redwater Bridge near Spearfish, South Dakota was built in 1910.  It was built by the Standard Bridge Company.  It was listed on the National Register of Historic Places in 1993. It spans the Redwater River, south of Belle Fourche. The  bridge was built in 1910 and has been listed on the National Register of Historic Places since 1993.

References

Bridges completed in 1910
Buildings and structures in Lawrence County, South Dakota
Road bridges on the National Register of Historic Places in South Dakota
National Register of Historic Places in Lawrence County, South Dakota
Spearfish, South Dakota
Pratt truss bridges in the United States